Obersee is a lake on Oberseealp in the Canton of Glarus, Switzerland. There is a hotel on the lakeside which overlooks the lake and the Brünnelistock. During a cold and dry winter, there is a chance of black ice developing.

See also
List of mountain lakes of Switzerland

External links

Lakes of Switzerland
Lakes of the canton of Glarus